La Cruz is a district of the La Cruz canton, in the Guanacaste province of Costa Rica. It is located in the north of the country, near the border with Nicaragua.

Geography 
La Cruz has an area of  km² and an elevation of  metres.

Villages
Administrative center of the district is the town of La Cruz.

Other villages in the district are Bellavista, Bello Horizonte, Brisas, Cacao, Carrizal, Carrizales, Colonia Bolaños, Copalchí, Infierno, Jobo, Monte Plata, Montes de Oro, Pampa, Pegón, Peñas Blancas, Piedra Pómez, Puerto Soley, Recreo, San Buenaventura, San Dimas, San Paco, San Roque, Santa Rogelia, Santa Rosa, Soley, Sonzapote, Tempatal and Vueltas.

Demographics 

For the 2011 census, La Cruz had a population of  inhabitants.

Transportation

Road transportation 
The district is covered by the following road routes:
 National Route 1
 National Route 4
 National Route 935
 National Route 938
 National Route 939

References 

Districts of Guanacaste Province
Populated places in Guanacaste Province